is one of syllable in Javanese script that represent the sound /ŋɔ/, /ŋa/. It is transliterated to Latin as "nga", and sometimes in Indonesian orthography as "ngo".

Pasangan 
Its pasangan form , is located on the bottom side of the previous syllable.

Extended form 
The letter  doesn't have a murda form.

 with a cerek is called I kawi.

Final consonant 
 cannot became final consonant (e.g. ). It is replaced by cecak. For example:  - cacing (worm), not

Glyphs

Unicode block 

Javanese script was added to the Unicode Standard in October, 2009 with the release of version 5.2.

See also
 Nga (Indic)

References 

Javanese script